The following is an incomplete list of current and defunct magazines published in Germany. Their language may be German or other languages.

0-9

11 Freunde
1000°
5vor12

A

ABC-Zeitung
Abenteuer Archäologie
ABI Technik
ADAC Motorwelt
Aero International
Aerokurier
Der Aktionär
 Die Aktuelle
 ARCH+
Architectural Digest
 Architektur der DDR
 auf einen Blick
 Auto Bild
 Auto Magazin
 Autozeitung

B

 Bahamas
 Bauhaus
 Der Bazar
 Berlin Rom Tokio
 Berliner Illustrirte Zeitung
 Bild der Frau
 Boa Vista 
 Die Brennessei
 Brigitte
 Bunte
 Bravo
 Bravo Girl
 Bravo Sport
 Burda Style

C

Capital
 Carina
 Centurion 
Chrismon
 Cicero
 Computer Zeitung
 c't

D

 Damals
 Das Deutsche Mädel
 DAV Panorama
 Dein Spiegel
 Deutsches Ärzteblatt
 Die Dame
 DU&ICH

E

Eisenbahn-Kurier
EMMA
Euro am Sonntag
The European
European Coatings Journal
European Photography
Exberliner

F

 Fikrun wa Fann
 Fisch & Fang
 Filmspiegel
Finanztest
 Five 
Fix und Foxi
 Focus
 Focus Money
 Form und Zweck
 Freizeit Revue
 Freundin
 Die Freundin
 Fuldaer Geschichtsblätter
 Funk Uhr
 Für Dich

G

Die Gartenlaube (1853-1944)
Geld Idee
 Die Gesellschaft
 GEO 
 GEO Epoche
 German Life
Gong
Graswurzelrevolution
Greenpeace Magazine
Guter Rat!

H

 Hartbeat Magazine
 Hörzu

I
 Illustrirte Zeitung
 Impulse
 Internationale Politik

J
Journal für die Frau
Jugend
Juice

K
 Kaveh
 Kultur im Heim
 Kunst und Künstler

L

 Landlust
 Der Landser
 Das Leben
 Das literarische Echo
Lustige Blätter

M

Mad
 Das Magazin
 Manager Magazin
Männer
Meggendorfer-Blätter
Melodie und Rhythmus
Merian
Merkur
Metal Hammer
Micky Maus
Mike, der Taschengeldexperte
Mono.Kultur

N

 Nation und Europa
 Neon Zombie
Neue Berliner Illustrierte
 Neue Post
 Neue Werbung
 Neuer Weg
 Neues Leben

O

Opernwelt
Der Orchideengarten
Orkus
Ostara

P

Pan
 pardon
 Das Pfennig-Magazin
Phöbus
Physik Journal
Das Plakat
Procycling

Q
 Der Querschnitt

R
Räte-Zeitung
Revue des Monats
Runner's World

S

 Schnitt
 Schöner Wohnen
 Seidels Reklame
 Sibylle
 Signum
 Simplicissimus
 Sinn und Form
 Spektrum der Wissenschaft
 Dein Spiegel
 Der Spiegel
 Spiegel Online
 Sport Bild
 Stern
Studentenkurier
Der Sturm

T

Think:act
Titanic
TV-Hören und Sehen
Twen

U
 Ulenspiegel
 Über Land und Meer

W

Der Wahre Jacob 
 Das Wespennest
White Dwarf
 Wild und Hund
 Wirtschaftswoche
 WOM magazin

Z

Zeit Wissen
Zeitschrift für Musikwissenschaft
Zillo
Zuerst!

See also
 List of newspapers in Germany
 Media of Germany

References

 
Magazines
German